Dioscorea floribunda, the medicinal yam or mule's-hoof, is a species of flowering plant in the family Dioscoreaceae. It is found from central Mexico to northern Central America. It is grown commercially for its diosgenin content.

References

floribunda
Medicinal plants of Central America
Flora of Southwestern Mexico
Flora of Central Mexico
Flora of Southeastern Mexico
Flora of Guatemala
Flora of Belize
Flora of El Salvador
Flora of Honduras
Plants described in 1842